This Storm is the second full-length album by Sonya Kitchell. Kitchell was only 17 when she made this album. J. Poet of AllMusic writes that "This Storm is an album of rare warmth and beauty, with a bright pop pulse that heralds Kitchell as a superlative new talent."

Track listing

Track information and credits were taken from the album's liner notes.

References

External links
Sonya Kitchell Official Site
Decca Records Official Site

2008 albums
Sonya Kitchell albums
Decca Records albums